David McAllester may refer to:

David A. McAllester (born 1956), computer scientist and artificial intelligence researcher
David P. McAllester (1916–2006), ethnomusicologist
David S. McAllester (born 1983), founder of BIGPLAY and host of the BIGPLAY Reflog Show

See also
David McAllister (disambiguation)